The Knox Group is a widespread geologic group in the Southeastern United States. Though not commonly fossiliferous, it preserves fossils dating back to the Cambrian period.  Typical lithologies include thick-bedded cherty dolomites and limestones.  Associated minerals include barite, fluorite, lead, and most importantly zinc in the form of the mineral sphalerite.  Oil and gas also occur in the Knox Group beneath the Appalachian Plateaus.

See also

 List of fossiliferous stratigraphic units in Alabama
 Paleontology in Alabama

References
 Knox on Fossilworks

Geologic formations of Alabama
Geologic formations of Tennessee
Cambrian West Virginia
Ordovician West Virginia